Insaniyat kay Dushman is a 1990 Pakistani action film, directed by Hasnain and produced by Tariq Butt. The film stars actors Anjuman, Nadeem, Neeli, Sultan Rahi and Afzaal Ahmad.

Cast
 Anjuman - (Miss Rita)
 Nadeem - (Deputy Shehzad Khan)
 Neeli - (Bobby)
 Sultan Rahi - (D.I.G Basheer)
 Izhar Qazi - (Johnny)
 Kanwal - (Jameela)
 Albela
 Masood Akhtar - (Adjacent)
 Abid Ali - (Nawab Saab)
 Afzaal Ahmed - (Chief)
 Humayun Qureshi - (Alish)
 Munawar Saeed - (Shaka)
 Nasrrullah Butt - (King Kong)
 Baadal - (Cobra)

Crew
Writer - Nasir Adib
Producer - Tariq Butt 
Production Company - Rameez films
Cinematographer - Saleem Butt
Music Director - M. Ashraf
Lyricist - Saeed Gilani
Playback Singers - Noor Jehan, A. Nayyar, Ghulam Abbas

Music and film songs
 Gorey Badan Chon Masti ... Singer(s): Noor Jahan, A. Nayyar, Ghulam Abbas
 Tu Meri Jan Meray Jeeney Ka Sahara ... Singer(s): Ghulam Abbas

Awards
This film won a total of 4 awards as listed below:
Nigar Award for 'Best Film' of 1990
Nigar Award for 'Best Director' of 1990
Nigar Award for 'Best Scriptwriter' of 1990
Nigar Award for 'Best Actress' of 1990

References

1990 films
1990s political films
Pakistani action films
Punjabi-language Pakistani films
1990s action films
1990s Punjabi-language films
1990s Urdu-language films
Nigar Award winners